"Janie's Got a Gun" is a song by American rock band Aerosmith and written by Steven Tyler and Tom Hamilton. The song was released as the second single from Pump in 1989, peaking at number four on the US Billboard Hot 100 and number two on the Billboard Album Rock Tracks chart in 1990. In Australia, the song reached number one, becoming Aerosmith's first of two number-one singles there. It also reached number two in Canada, number 12 in Sweden, and number 13 in New Zealand.

The song describes a young woman planning her revenge for childhood abuse.  It won the band a 1990 Grammy Award for Best Rock Performance by a Duo or Group with Vocal.

Song structure
On the album, "Janie's Got a Gun" is preceded by a 10-second instrumental called "Water Song", which features the work of instrumentalist Randy Raine-Reusch, who uses a glass harmonica, wind gong, and bullroarers to produce the special effects heard at the start of the song.

Background and writing
Tyler came up with the main riff using a low-tone setting on his keyboard. Hamilton created the bassline. The guitars and drum parts were configured later and Tyler wrote the lyrics. The guitar solo, by Joe Perry, is accompanied by the main riff and rhythmic clapping. The song also uses the Slap Bass instrument patch from the Korg M1. In a 1994 interview with Rolling Stone, Tyler described the origin of the song: 

The singer declared, "I got really angry that nobody was paying homage to those who were abused by mom and dad." The line "He jacked a little bitty baby" was originally "He raped a little bitty baby," but Geffen Records A&R executive John Kalodner argued that the band should change it, explaining that he felt the song had the potential to be a hit and was certain it would not get played on commercial radio with the word "rape" in it. Tyler often sings the original line when performing live. In addition, the line "...and put a bullet in his brain" changed to "...she left him in the pouring rain" for the radio version.

Music video
The music video was directed by David Fincher. Janie is portrayed by actress Kristin Dattilo. Her parents are played by Nicholas Guest and Lesley Ann Warren.

Charts

Weekly charts

Year-end charts

Certifications

References

1980s ballads
1989 singles
1989 songs
Aerosmith songs
Geffen Records singles
Glam metal ballads
Hard rock ballads
Murder ballads
Music videos directed by David Fincher
Number-one singles in Australia
Song recordings produced by Bruce Fairbairn
Songs about child abuse
Songs written by Steven Tyler
Songs written by Tom Hamilton (musician)
Glam metal songs
Songs about revenge